Ranten is a municipality in the district of Murau in Styria, Austria.

Geography
Ranten lies 11 km northwest of Murau.

References

Cities and towns in Murau District